Marzano is an Italian surname. Notable people with the surname include:

Annalisa Marzano (born 1969), Italian-American archaeologist 
Antonio Marzano (born 1935), Italian economist and politician
John Marzano (1963–2008), American baseball player
Marco Marzano (born 1980), Italian cyclist
Robert J. Marzano, American educational researcher 
Stefano Marzano (born 1950), Italian designer

Italian-language surnames